Frederick Frost Blackman FRS (25 July 1866 – 30 January 1947) was a British plant physiologist.

Frederick Blackman was born in Lambeth, London to a doctor. He studied medicine at St. Bartholomew's Hospital, graduating MA. In the subsequent years, he studied natural sciences at the University of Cambridge and was awarded DSc.

He conducted research on plant physiology, in particular photosynthesis, in Cambridge until his retirement in 1936. Gabrielle Matthaei was his assistant until 1905. He was elected in May 1906 a Fellow of the Royal Society, his candidature citation reading "Fellow of St John's College, Cambridge. Ex-Lecturer and now Reader in Botany in the University." He has made distinguished investigations in plant physiology. In 1921 he was awarded the Royal Medal and in 1923 delivered the Croonian lecture.

He was buried at the Parish of the Ascension Burial Ground in Cambridge, with his wife Elsie (1882 - 1967).

Blackman's law of limiting factors 

Blackman proposed the law of limiting factors in 1905. According to this law, when a process depends on a number of factors, its rate is limited by the pace of the slowest factor. Blackman's law is illustrated by C O2 concentration as a limiting factor in the rate of oxygen production in photosynthesis:

Suppose a leaf is exposed to a certain light intensity which can use 5 mg. of C O2 per hour in photosynthesis. If only 1 mg. of C O2 enters the leaf in an hour, the rate of photosynthesis is limited due to C O2 factor. But as the concentration of the C O2 increases from 1 to 5 mg./hour the rate of photosynthesis is also increased.

Works
"Experimental researches in vegetable assimilation and respiration":
 1895: "On a new method for investigating the carbonic acid exchanges of plants", Annals of Botany 9(1): 161 
 1895: "On the paths of gaseous exchange between areal leaves and the atmosphere", Annals of Botany
 1895: (with Gabrielle Matthaei) "On the effect of temperature on carbon dioxide assimilation"
 1905: (with Gabrielle Matthaei) A Quantitative Study of Carbon Dioxide Assimilation and Leaf Temperature in Natural Illumination, Philosophical Transactions of the Royal Society at London via Jstor
 1905: "Optima and Limiting Factors", Annals of Botany,

See also
Dorothea Pertz

References

Further reading

External links
 

1866 births
1947 deaths
People from Lambeth
British botanists
Fellows of the Royal Society
Royal Medal winners
Plant physiologists